Brian LeMay (born 26 May 1983 in the United States) was a United States rugby union player. His playing position was prop. He was selected as a reserve for the United States at the 2007 Rugby World Cup, but did not make an appearance. He though did make 1 international appearance for the United States against Japan in 2008.

Reference list

External links
itsrugby.co.uk profile

1983 births
United States international rugby union players
Living people
Rugby union props